General Simmons may refer to:

Benjamin Taylor Simmons (1871–1933), U.S. Army brigadier general
Dana A. Simmons (fl. 1970s–2010s), U.S. Air Force brigadier general
Edwin H. Simmons (1921–2007), U.S. Marine Corps brigadier general
Frank Keith Simmons (1888–1952), British Army major general
Lintorn Simmons (1821–1903), British Army general

See also
George S. Simonds (1874–1938), U.S. Army major general
Guy Simonds (1903–1974), Canadian Army lieutenant general
Henry Simon (general) (born 1921), U.S. Air Force major general
Max Simon (1899–1961), German Waffen-SS general